The War of the Roses, (also known in its last years as the County of Origin Series) was the inter-county rugby league matches between representative teams from Yorkshire and Lancashire, the areas where rugby league has traditionally been most popular in England.  The series started in 1895 and was last played in 2003.

History
The first War of the Roses was contested in 1895 as part of the County Championship. The majority of the clubs in rugby league came from Yorkshire and Lancashire and the fixtures was held almost annually, with exceptions for the two world wars (1914–1918 and 1939–1945) and 1977–1978, until 1983 when the County Championship was abandoned.  Fixtures between Lancashire and Yorkshire briefly returned firstly between 1985 and 1991 and then again between 2001 and 2003. Eligibility to play was established either by county of birth or in which county players had originally played the sport professionally.

In 1985, an annual fixture between Lancashire and Yorkshire was proposed as a replacement for the County Championship. The fixture became known as the Rodstock War of the Roses and the first game was played in September 1985. The series lasted until 1991, when it was scrapped due to lack of interest.

The fixture was revived in 2001 under the name of the County of Origin series, inspired by the success of Australia's State of Origin series between New South Wales and Queensland. After three years, the Origin series games were discontinued due to falling attendances.

Roses matches have continued at amateur level as part of the BARLA Three Counties Championship but despite several calls for a return at professional level the fixture remains unplayed.

Results
The two teams have met in 91 competitive matches with each team having won 44 and three games ending in draws. In addition there have been a number of exhibition matches during the First and Second World Wars when the County Championship was suspended.

International touring teams
Both Lancashire and Yorkshire have played numerous matches against touring Australian and New Zealand teams. From the 1967–68 Kangaroo Tour, both Lancashire and Yorkshire were taken off the Australian's itinerary with the only county side they played being Cumbria.

Lancashire
Also see :Category:Lancashire rugby league team coaches, :Category:Lancashire rugby league team players.

Yorkshire
Also see :Category:Yorkshire rugby league team coaches, :Category:Yorkshire rugby league team players.

Women's Rugby League
In 2015, the RFL announced that they would stage the inaugural Women's "War of the Roses", between Lancashire Ladies and Yorkshire Ladies. The match, which took place at Thatto Heath Crusaders, St. Helens, saw the sides share the honours after a 22–22 draw, with an attendance of around 500.

The match, held on 18 October 2015, followed a Lancashire Girls vs Yorkshire Girls under 18s match, which finished 34–0 in favour of the Yorkshire side.

Results

See also
 International Origin
 Roses rivalry

References

Rugby league competitions in the United Kingdom
Rugby league in Yorkshire
Rugby league in Lancashire